Tattoo the Earth was a concert tour from 2000 to 2002 in the United States. Scott Alderman, the festival's creator, believed that the tour would help "catch the vibe" between the musical artists and the body artists, saying in a prepared statement, "Nothing represents the counter youth culture like music and body art. It is a statement of purpose and a passport to another way of living. We're simply creating a venue where it can be expressed."

MTV revealed on June 6, 2000 that Slayer and Sepultura recently joined the tour. Metallica, which was originally not part of the tour, officially announced on June 13, 2000 that they would be joining it. The following day, Stone Temple Pilots announced plans to join the tour.

The tour, with part of it taking place during the summer, posed a challenge to Slipknot in particular. The band performed onstage in masks, and even under the best circumstances, they found them uncomfortable. The band's drummer Joey Jordison commented, "Everyone passes out two or three times per tour. It never happens 'til the end of the show. People are like, 'I don't know how you do it with the mask on, let alone one-piece wool coveralls in 110 degree heat.' But it's the music that drives us, and we've built up a tolerance for it."

Alderman announced in 2022 that the tour would return in August that year, with Anthrax headlining.

Tour dates

Bands

2000:
 Slipknot 
 Slayer
 Sepultura
 Sevendust
 Hed PE
 Nashville Pussy
 Spineshank (replaced Puya after they dropped off the tour before it starts )
 Downset
 Cold (until July 30)
 Mudvayne
 Hatebreed
 Full Devil Jacket
 One Minute Silence (started on July 27)
 U.P.O. (until July 30)
 Nothingface
 Professional Murder Music (started on July 30)
 Amen
 Systematic (until July 28)
 Esham
 The Workhorse Movement 
 Relative Ash
 Famous

Coal Chamber was scheduled as one of the tour headliners, but dropped off before it starts

Select shows:
 Stone Temple Pilots (Portland only)
 Metallica (New Jersey only)
 Dope (Iowa only)
 Lamb of God

Tattoo artists
Forty-two tattoo artists were featured at the tour.

 Jack Lowe
 Matt Schager
 Bernie Luther
 Sean Vasquez
 Kari Barba
 Mike Davis
 Chuck Eldridge
 Grime
 Don Ed Hardy
 Patty Kelley
 Corey Miller
 Ethan Morgan
 Jack Rudy
 Lyle Tuttle
 Eric Merrill
 Flo Amblard
 Tin Tin
 Deano Cook
 Tony Olivas
 Michael Hubert
 Guy Aitchison
 James Kern
 Ben Wahhhh
 Genziana
 Horishio
 Horitoshi
 Shige
 Borneo Headhunters
 Kurt Wiscombe
 Chris Dingwell
 Bob Tyrrell
 Leo Zulueta
 Sieto Van der Velde
 Joe Capobianco
 Mario Barth
 Paul Booth
 Jon Clue
 Anil Gupta
 Pat Sinatra
 Robert Hernandez
 Filip Leu
 Timothy Hoyer
 Aaron Bell

References

Further reading
 Tattoo The Earth Shuffles Bands As Tour Kicks Off at MTV
 Slipknot, Slayer Make Mark On Tattoo Festival Kickoff at VH1
  ROCK REVIEW; Outsiders Venting Their Inner Darkness at The New York Times
 Slipknot, More Brawl With Security At "Tattoo" Show at MTV
 Slipknot And Slayer Help Tattoo The Earth Wrap Up A Success at Yahoo!
 Tattoo The Earth Reaches Record Stores at Yahoo!
 Metal + Tattoos + Planet Earth = Plagiarism? at MTV
 The Killers, Flaming Lips to headline Atlanta festival at NME
 Roadtripping at The Boston Phoenix
 Clear Channel Goes to Trial at Rolling Stone

External links
 Official website

2000 concert tours
2001 concert tours
2002 concert tours
Slipknot (band) concert tours